Guigues Guiffrey, lord of Boutières (born in the Tower House at Cheylas, France on 13 May 1497), was a French soldier in the Italian Wars. He married Gasparde Berlioz in 1526. 

In 1521, he served under the Chevalier Bayard in the siege of Mézières in the Ardennes, and in 1524 he commanded a company of gendarmes in the defense of Marseilles against the Imperial forces.

The French king, Francis I, named him military governor of Turin, Italy, in 1537, but because of his mediocre administrative talents he served just a short time. He acquired the château of Touvet during the Dauphiné period.

In 1544, he commanded the French forces in the Piedmont but when he allowed the town of Carignan to fall to the enemy, he fell into disgrace and was relieved of his command. On the nomination of the Count of Enghien, he took part under the orders of this new general in  the Battle of Ceresole, where he won fame through his skillful use of the cavalry charge. He ended his military career in fighting the English during the expedition on the Isle of Wight.

References

Boutieres, Guigues Guiffrey, seigneur de
1492 births
1545 deaths